Crossgatehall Halt railway station served the Dalkeith Colliery pits in the hamlet of Crossgatehall, East Lothian, Scotland, from 1913 to 1930 on the Macmerry Branch.

History 
The station was opened on 1 August 1913 by the North British Railway. Opposite the platform was Dalkeith Colliery signal box, which opened a year before the station. The station closed on 1 January 1917 but reopened on 1 February 1919, before closing permanently on 22 September 1930. The railway cottage to the north survives, although in a heavily modified state.

References 

Disused railway stations in East Lothian
Former North British Railway stations
Railway stations in Great Britain opened in 1913
Railway stations in Great Britain closed in 1917
Railway stations in Great Britain opened in 1919
Railway stations in Great Britain closed in 1930
1913 establishments in Scotland
1930 disestablishments in Scotland